Free 6lack (stylized in all caps) is the debut studio album by American singer 6lack. It was released on November 18, 2016, by LVRN and Interscope Records. The album was supported by two singles: "Ex Calling" and "Prblms". It was nominated at the 60th Annual Grammy Awards for Best Urban Contemporary Album.

Release
On November 13, 2017, three additional new songs were added to the album to celebrate the album's anniversary.

Singles
The first single from the album, "Ex Calling", was released on July 25, 2016. The song contains samples of "Perkys Calling" by Future from the mixtape Purple Reign. The music video for "Ex Calling" was released on December 5, 2016.

The second single from the album, "Prblms", was released on September 23, 2016. The music video for "Problems", featuring 6lack rapping next to a grizzly bear, was released on October 14, 2016.

Commercial performance
Free 6lack debuted at number 68 on the US Billboard 200 for the chart dated December 10, 2016 and has since peaked at number 34.

Track listing
Album credits were adapted from Tidal.

Notes
  signifies a co-producer
  signifies an additional producer
  signifies an uncredited producer

Sample credits
 "Rules" contains samples of "Shadow Knows" performed by Aqua Nebula Oscillator.
 "Luving U" contains a sample of Slow Meadow's original composition "Lachrymosia".
 "Ex Calling" contains samples of "Perkys Calling" performed by Future.

Personnel
Album credits were adapted from AllMusic and Tidal.

Performers
 6lack – primary artist

Production
 FWDSLXSH – producer 
 MDS – producer 
 Alex Leone – producer 
 Frank Dukes – producer 
 Syk Sense – producer 
 OZ – producer 
 Singawd – producer , additional producer 
 Nova – producer 
 Jakob Rabitsch – producer 
 Bizness Boi – producer 
 Breyan Isaac – producer 
 Karl Rubin – producer 
 Roofeeo – producer 
 Childish Major – producer 
 Take A Daytrip – producer 
 6lack – producer 
 JT Gagarin – producer , additional producer 
 Southside – producer 
 DZL – producer 
 Dot da Genius – producer 
 Jon Castelli – producer 
 Julian Beats – producer 
 Lucian Blomkamp – producer , additional producer 
 Stwo – producer 

Technical
 JT Gagarin – recording engineer , mixing engineer 
 Jon Castelli – mixing engineer

Charts

Weekly charts

Year-end charts

Certifications

References

2016 debut albums
Hip hop albums by American artists
Albums produced by Frank Dukes
Albums produced by Southside (record producer)
Albums produced by Dot da Genius
Albums produced by Take a Daytrip